Luis Dávila may refer to:

Luis Dávila Colón, Puerto Rican political activist
Luis Dávila (actor) (1927–1998), Argentine actor
Luis Davila (boxer) (born 1954), Puerto Rican boxer
Luis Alfonso Dávila (born 1943), Venezuelan politician
Luis Yordán Dávila (1869–1932), Puerto Rican mayor of Ponce